The Polyctenidae are a rarely collected family of parasitic bugs of the superfamily Cimicoidea. Polyctenidae species or bat bugs are obligate, hematophagous ectoparasites of bats. These insects are not to be confused with cimicid bat bugs, which are members of the family Cimicidae. A significant relationship appears to occur between the family groups and the species of hosts that indicates co-evolution and specialization.

There are currently 32 species of polyctenid bat bugs recognized world wide belonging to two subfamilies and five genera.  Polyctenidae species occur both in the Old World  (subfamily Polycteninae) and New World (subfamily Hesperocteninae).

Subtaxa

Subfamily Polycteninae:
Genus Adroctenes
Adroctenes horvathi
Adroctenes jordani
Adroctenes magnus
Genus Eoctenes
Eoctenes intermedius
Eoctenes spasmae
Eoctenes sinae
Eoctenes ferrisi
Eoctenes maai
Eoctenes nycteridis
Eoctenes coleurae
Genus Hypoctenes
Hypoctenes petiolatus
Hypoctenes quadratus
Hypoctenes hutsoni
Hypoctenes clarus
Hypoctenes faini
Genus Polyctenes
Polyctenes molossus
Subfamily Hesperocteninae:
Genus Hesperoctenes
Hesperoctenes abalosi
Hesperoctenes angustatus
Hesperoctenes cartus
Hesperoctenes chorote
Hesperoctenes eumops
Hesperoctenes fumarius
Hesperoctenes giganteus
Hesperoctenes hermsi
Hesperoctenes impressus
Hesperoctenes limai
Hesperoctenes longiceps
Hesperoctenes minor
Hesperoctenes parvulus
Hesperoctenes setosus
Hesperoctenes tarsalis
Hesperoctenes vicinus

References 

Cimicomorpha
Parasitic bugs
Parasites of bats
Heteroptera families